The 1940 United States presidential election in Montana took place on November 5, 1940 as part of the 1940 United States presidential election. Voters chose four representatives, or electors to the Electoral College, who voted for president and vice president.

Montana voted powerfully to give Democratic nominee, President Franklin D. Roosevelt an unprecedented third term, over the Republican nominee, corporate lawyer Wendell Willkie, a dark horse candidate that had never before run for a political office. Roosevelt won Montana by a convincing 18.61% margin. , this remains the last election in which the following counties have voted for a Democratic presidential nominee: Broadwater, Madison, Meagher and Garfield.

Results

Results by county

See also
 United States presidential elections in Montana

References

Montana
1940
1940 Montana elections